Štěchovice is a market town in Prague-West District in the Central Bohemian Region of the Czech Republic. It has about 2,100 inhabitants.

Administrative parts
Villages of Masečín and Třebenice are administrative parts of Štěchovice.

Geography
It lies in the Benešov Uplands. The market town is situated on the left bank of the Vltava River. The Vltava and the Štěchovice Reservoir, built on the river in 1937–1945, form the eastern municipal border.

History
The first written mention of Štěchovice is in a deed of King Ottokar I of Bohemia from 1205. Třebenice was first mentioned in 1055 and Masečín in 1310. For centuries, Štěchovice was divided into several parts, which belonged to different estates with different owners. In the 14th century, there were gold mines in the area, thanks to which the growth of the village accelerated. In 1437, Štěchovice was first referred to as a market town. Gold mining ended during the Thirty Years' War, and the livelihood of the inhabitants shifted to the use of the Vltava River for transport.

Sights
The landmark of Štěchovice is the Church of Saint John the Baptist. It was built mainly in the Art Nouveau style in 1911–1913 and belongs to the most important Czech sacral buildings of the 20th century. Prominent artists, such as Vojtěch Sucharda or Čeněk Vosmík, participated in the sculptural decoration of the church.

Notable people
Zorka Janů (1921–1946), actress

Twin towns – sister cities

Štěchovice is twinned with:
 Kalmthout, Belgium
 San Juan Nepomuceno, Paraguay

References

External links

Market towns in the Czech Republic